Mecklenburg is a region in northern Germany, once a state of the Holy Roman Empire.

Mecklenburg may also refer to:

Geography

Germany
 Mecklenburg-Vorpommern, a German state
 Mecklenburg Lake District
 Dorf Mecklenburg, a village

Historical
 Grand Duchy of Mecklenburg-Schwerin, a former German Grand Duchy
 Grand Duchy of Mecklenburg-Strelitz, a former Grand Duchy
 Mecklenburg-Güstrow, a former duchy
 Free State of Mecklenburg-Schwerin
 Free State of Mecklenburg-Strelitz
 State of Mecklenburg, a subdivision of the Soviet occupation zone (1945–1949) and the German Democratic Republic (1949–1952)
 Mecklenburg Castle

United States
 Mecklenburg County, North Carolina
 Mecklenburg County, Virginia

Canada
 Mecklenburg District as it was known 1788–1792, renamed to "Midland District" in 1792 and abolished 1849

People
House of Mecklenburg
Mecklenburg (Dano-Norwegian family)
Fred Mecklenburg, American physician and anti-abortion activist
Karl Mecklenburg, American Football player
Lucy Mecklenburgh, former star of The Only Way Is Essex
Marjory Mecklenburg, American government administrator and anti-abortion activist

Ships
 SMS Mecklenburg, an early 20th century ship of the Kaiserliche Marine
 HMS Mecklenburgh, an eighteenth century ship of the Royal Navy

See also
 Meck (disambiguation)
 Mecklenburger, a horse breed